Robert Potter (died 1 October 1854) was an Irish Independent Irish Party politician.

Potter became an Independent Irish Party MP for Limerick City at the 1852 general election but died two years later in 1854.

References

External links
 

UK MPs 1852–1857
Members of the Parliament of the United Kingdom for County Limerick constituencies (1801–1922)
Independent Nationalist MPs
1854 deaths